For Common Sense Party see:
 American Common Sense Party
 Party of Common Sense, Czech Republic
 Libertair, Direct, Democratisch, Common Sense Party of Belgium